The 2017–18 season covered the period from 1 July 2017 to 30 June 2018. It was Bury's 133rd season since the club was founded in 1885 and their third consecutive season in League One. They finished bottom of League One and were relegated to EFL League Two for the 2018–19 season. Besides competing in League Two, the team participated in the FA Cup, the EFL Cup and the EFL Trophy.

Competitions

Friendlies
As of 15 June 2017, Bury have announced seven pre-season friendlies against Salford City, Macclesfield Town, Crewe Alexandra, Sunderland, Huddersfield Town and Radcliffe Borough.

League One

League table

Result summary

Results by matchday

Matches
On 21 June 2017, the league fixtures were announced.

FA Cup
On 16 October 2017, Bury were drawn away to either Woking or Concord Rangers in the first round. Woking won the replayed match 2–1 to host the first round tie. A draw in the first round meant a replay would need to be played at Gigg Lane.

EFL Cup
On 16 June 2017, Bury were drawn at home to Sunderland in the first round.

EFL Trophy
On 12 July 2017, the group stage draw was completed with Bury facing Blackburn Rovers, Rochdale and Stoke City U23s in Northern Group C. After finished second in their group and advancing to the next round, Bury were drawn away to Walsall. A home tie in the third round was confirmed next against Fleetwood Town.

Transfers

Transfers in

Transfers out

Loans in

Loans out

References

Bury
Bury F.C. seasons